The Albanian–Romanian linguistic relationship is a field of the research of the ethnogenesis of both peoples. The common phonological, morphological and syntactical features of the two languages have been studied for more than a century.  Both languages are part of the Balkan sprachbund but there are certain elements shared only by Albanian and Romanian and its close relatives descended from Common Romanian. Aside from Latin, and from shared Greek, Slavic and Turkish elements, other characteristics and words are attributed to the Paleo-Balkan linguistic base: Illyrian, Thracian, Dacian and/or Thraco-Illyrian, Daco-Thracian. Similarities between Romanian and Albanian are not limited to their common Balkan features and the assumed substrate words: the two languages share calques and proverbs, and display analogous phonetic changes.

Despite the similarities, genetically they are only distantly related Indo-European languages.

Background

Romanian 

Romanian is a Romance language spoken by about 25 million people primarily in Southeastern Europe. Its principal variant, Daco-Romanian, is the official language of Romania and Moldova. A second variant, Macedo-Romanian (or Aromanian), is spoken by about 350,000 people in Albania, southwestern Bulgaria, northern Greece and North Macedonia. The third variant, Megleno-Romanian, exists in the Meglen region in southeastern North Macedonia and northern Greece. The fourth variant, Istro-Romanian, is spoken in eight settlements in Istria (in Croatia). The four variants developed from a common ancestor, known as Common Romanian. The venue of the formation of Proto-Romanian is debated. Some scholars propose that the Roman province of Dacia Traiana (which existed to the north of the Lower Danube from 106 AD to 271) was included in the Romanians' homeland. Other scholars say that Proto-Romanian descended from the Vulgar Latin spoken in the south-Danubian Roman provinces and the Romanians' ancestors started to settle in most regions of Romania only in the 12th century.

Romanian and Aromanian languages diverged only in the ninth or tenth century

Albanian 

Forming a separate branch of the Indo-European language family, Albanian is spoken by about 6.5 million people in Albania and the nearby regions in Montenegro, Kosovo, Serbia, North Macedonia and Greece. Albanian has two main dialects, Gheg and Tosk, with the former spoken to the north of the river Shkumbin (Scampis) and the latter to the south of the river. Two varieties of the Tosk dialect, Arvanitika in Greece and Arbëresh in southern Italy, preserved archaic elements of the language. Gheg and Tosk which are primarily distinguished by phonological differences are mutually intelligible. According to concurring scholarly theories, Albanian is regarded as the direct descendant of ancient Illyrian or Thracian languages, or of the hypothetical Daco-Mysian language.

Tosk/Gheg differentiation leading to regular correspondences,
affect native words, Latin loans, and Classical Greek loans, but not Slavic loans, led researchers to the conclusion that the dialectal split preceded the Slavic migration to the Balkans. According to the view of Demiraj, at the time of the Tosk/Gheg split, Albanian populations were roughly in their present location, while Eric Hamp agrees "it must be relatively old, that is, dating back into the post-Roman first millennium", and speculates Tosk/Gheg isoglosses could reflect "a spread of the speech area, after the settlement of the Albanians in roughly their present location, so that the speech area straddled the Jireček Line".

Balkan linguistic area 

Albanian and Romanian, along with Bulgarian and Macedonian, are the core members of the Balkan linguistic areaan area of linguistic convergence affecting six to eight languages in the Balkan Peninsula (in Southeastern Europe). Linguists also list the Torlakian dialect of Serbo-Croatian and Greek among the members of the same linguistic area. The membership of the Balkan dialects of Romani (or Gypsy) and of Turkish is debated, although they share some characteristics with the other idioms. Scholars agree that only common characteristics shared by more than two languages in the group can be regarded as true Balkan features. Albanian and Romanian share most Balkan features, but they also have common features which do not characterize other Balkan languages.

The existence of an unrounded central voweleither a mid central vowel (ə) or a close central unrounded vowel (ɨ)is the principal common phonological feature of most Balkan languages, although these vowels are not present in Greek and standard Macedonian. The loss or limited usage of infinitives characterizes all Balkan languages, but Albanian developed a new type after losing the inherited form. The postponed article is also a well-known Balkanism, missing only from Greek: for instance, Albanian nënë and nëna ("mother" and "the mother"), Bulgarian selo and seloto ("village" and "the village"), and Romanian om and omul ("man" and "the man"). Most Balkan languages use the auxiliary verb "want" when creating verbs in future tense and merged the dative and genitive cases in nominal declension.

Literature 
Johann Erich Thunmann who published Theodore Kavalliotis' Greek–Aromanian–Albanian dictionary in 1774 was the first scholar to notice that Albanian and Romanian share a number of elements of their vocabulary. Gustav Meyer listed most common lexical elements of the two languages in his Etymologisches Wörterbuch der albanesischen Sprache ("Etymological Dictionary of the Albanian Language") in 1891. The Romanian philologist Bogdan Petriceicu Hasdeu who studied the pre-Latin elements of the Romanian language came to the conclusion (in 1901) that the origin of the shared vocabulary was most probably to be searched in the earliest phase of the two peoples' ethnogenesis. Thereafter, a number of Romanian linguistsAlexandru Philippide, Alexandru Rosetti, Grigore Brâncuș and othersstudied the similarities of Albanian and Romanian, especially in connection with their research on the origin of the Romanians. The Albanian linguist Eqrem Çabej was the first to emphasize the similar phonological and morphological elements of the two languages. He also drew attention to the similarities between Albanian and Romanian proverbs and the parallel development of the formation of sentences.

Common features

Phonology 
The Tosk dialect of Albanian, spoken in Southern Albania, in particular is held to have experienced developments parallel to early Romanian. These notably include the centralization of  before nasals, rhotacism of intervocalic  (regular in Tosk, more limited in Romanian : see LAMINA > lamura). Some words of the shared Albanian–Romanian lexicon, such as vatra/vatră, in Romanian clearly agree with the Tosk form and not the Gheg (northern) Albanian form. The proposed interaction between Tosk and Romanian is held to have been the last stage of the crucial Albanian–Romanian period of convergence. Since these effects are marginal if present at all upon Slavic loans, they likely occurred before contact with Slavs.

In the latter case, variation in Albanian outcomes has been explained as being the effect of loans entering Albanian at different times.

Morphology 
When comparing the morphological elements of the four core languages of the Balkan linguistic area, scholars have concluded that Albanian and Romanian share most common features. Albanian and Romanian use postponed articles with proper names, while this feature is absent from Bulgarian and Macedonian.

Lexicon 
There are several hundred words in Romanian that are cognate only with Albanian cognates (see Substrate in Romanian),
 though by lower estimates there are 70–90 possible substrate words with Albanian cognates, and 29 terms are probably loanwords from Albanian.

Proposed explanations 

Hamp refers to an "Albanian substratum" in Romanian, arguing its early formation was shaped by language shift from Albanian to Latin, while Fine argues that the critical area of Albanian–Romanian contact was the valley of the river Great Morava in what is now eastern Serbia, before the Slavic invasions.

Noel Malcolm argues the Albanian–Romanian homeland was in the Kosovo region or in the Ancient Illyrian region of Dardania where both Romanian and Albanian speakers appear during the medieval period. Dutch linguist Michiel de Vaan, although he does not reach to any definite conclusions, suggests the same thing.

According to historian Noel Malcolm the Vlach-Romanian and Aromanian languages originated in the Kosovo region and surrounding areas from Romanized Illyrians and Thracians.
And was a contact zone between the Albanian and Romanian language.

Montenegrin highlands had a well-established Vlach-Romanian population by the early fourteenth century, when Vlach place-names are recorded there. And Albanian place-names.

Vlach-Romanian and Aromanian toponyms are present in the surrounding areas of Kosovo, such as Surdul in Southern Serbia. 
Donji Katun, Gornji Katun, Katun (Aleksinac) Katun (Vranje) in Southern Serbia, Katun, Pljevlja, Katun Božički and Katun Nahija in Montenegro. Katun is a living style associated with Eastern Romance people. Katun means 'village' in the Albanian, Aromanian and Romanian language.

Other scholars have differentiated different groups of Latin loans in Albanian representing different stages and historical scenarios. Albanian/Latin convergence began during the first century CE, with the dating of Latin loans used to differentiate between Early Proto-Albanian (just before initial imperial Latin contact) and Late Proto-Albanian (at the time of contact with Proto-Romance). There has also been a distinction between later convergence with different Romance languages in Albanian. Romanian scholars Vatasescu and Mihaescu, using lexical analysis of the Albanian language, have concluded that Albanian was also heavily influenced by an extinct Romance language that was distinct from both Romanian and Dalmatian. Because the Latin words common to only Romanian and Albanian are significantly less than those that are common to only Albanian and Western Romance, Mihaescu argues that the Albanian language evolved in a region with much greater contact to Western Romance regions than to Romanian-speaking regions, and located this region in present-day Albania, Kosovo and western North Macedonia, spanning east to Bitola and Pristina.

Scale 
Some scholars, such as Schuhardt and Meyer, have taken it to pronounce either Romanian to be "Latinized Albanian" or Albanian to be half-Romance. Later 20th century scholarship in Albania and Romania, represented especially by the works of Eqrem Çabej and Haralambie Mihaescu, has reconsidered many of the proposed Romance etyma in Albanian to in fact be cases of formations internal to Albanian that were based on older Romance loans, and voiced reservations that the extent of convergence was being exaggerated. Nevertheless, the latter group of scholars continue to view the Albanian–Romanian relationship as a pressing question in the histories of both languages.

See also 
Albania–Romania relations
Balkan sprachbund
Eastern Romance languages
History of Romanian

Notes

References

Bibliography

Further reading 

Albanian language
Romanian language
Albania–Romania relations
Comparison of Indo-European languages
Language contact
Balkan sprachbund